Seuserenre Bebiankh was a native ancient Egyptian king of the 16th Theban Dynasty during the Second Intermediate Period and, according to Kim Ryholt, the successor of king Semenre. He is assigned a reign of 12 years in the Turin Canon (11.8). 
Bebiankh was succeeded either by a poorly known king named Sekhemre Shedwast or by the equally shadowy ruler Seneferankhre Pepi III.

Attestations
Bebiankh is principally known by a stela found at Gebel Zeit that attests to mining activity conducted in this area by the Red Sea during his reign and preserves his royal names Seuserenre and Bebiankh. The modest stela records this king's activities in the Gebel Zeit galena mines.  He is also known to have built an extension to the Temple of Medamud. Bebiankh's nomen was also found on a bronze dagger found in Naqada and now in the British Museum, under the catalog number BM EA 66062.

References

17th-century BC Pharaohs
16th-century BC Pharaohs
Pharaohs of the Sixteenth Dynasty of Egypt